The Waterskiing at the 1987 Southeast Asian Games was held between 15 September to 16 September at Bedugul sea resort.

Medal summary

Men

Women's

Medal table

References
 http://eresources.nlb.gov.sg/newspapers/Digitised/Article/straitstimes19870917-1.2.57.22.4
https://news.google.com/newspapers?nid=x8G803Bi31IC&dat=19870917&printsec=frontpage&hl=en

1987 Southeast Asian Games